Valleroy may refer to the following places in France:

Valleroy, Doubs, a commune in the Doubs department 
Valleroy, Haute-Marne, a commune in the Haute-Marne department 
Valleroy, Meurthe-et-Moselle, a commune in the Meurthe-et-Moselle department